Thomas Mitchell (born 31 May 1993) is a professional Australian rules footballer playing for the Collingwood Football Club in the Australian Football League (AFL). He previously played for the Sydney Swans from 2012 to 2016, and the Hawthorn Football Club between 2017 and 2022. Mitchell won the Brownlow Medal as the league's best and fairest player in 2018 and set the record for the most disposals in a VFL/AFL match with 54 during that season.

Personal life

Tom grew up in Melbourne's eastern suburbs and attended Carey Baptist Grammar School, before relocating to Perth at 15 where he completed his schooling at Hale School. He helped Hale to two victories in the Public Schools Association Alcock Cup competition.

AFL career

Sydney (2012–2016)
Mitchell was drafted to Sydney with pick 21 in the 2011 AFL draft under the father–son rule. Mitchell experienced a number of injuries in 2012 and despite some good form in reserves games, was unable to break into the senior side that won the premiership.

Mitchell made his debut in round 10, 2013 against Essendon at the SCG. He received a 2013 AFL Rising Star nomination the following week for his round 11 performance against Adelaide. During round 9 of the 2014 season, Mitchell played in the Swans reserves team and had a record 64 disposals (23 contested, 41 uncontested) and kicked four goals.

At the conclusion of the 2016 season, Mitchell requested a trade from Sydney and was subsequently traded to Hawthorn in October.

Hawthorn (2017–2022)
In the 2017 season, Mitchell broke the VFL/AFL record for the most disposals in a home and away season in round 22 when he had his 749th possession, passing Wayne Richardson's mark set in 1971. Following a record-breaking home and away season, Mitchell was named in the All-Australian team for the first time. He was runner-up to Dustin Martin in the 2017 Brownlow Medal (Patrick Dangerfield polled more votes, but was ineligible due to suspension). Mitchell won his first Peter Crimmins Medal in that season.

On 24 March 2018, in round 1 of the 2018 season, Mitchell set the record for the most disposals in an VFL/AFL game of 54, also becoming the first player to have 50 or more disposals in more than one game. Mitchell had 50 possessions in Hawthorn's round 15 loss to GWS, becoming the first player to have more than one 50+ disposal game in a season. His 848 disposals in 2018 passed Matt Crouch's season record of 825, set in 2017.

Mitchell won the 2018 Brownlow Medal, the Peter Crimmins Medal, Leigh Matthews Trophy and the Lou Richards Medal. Mitchell became the first Hawthorn player to win the Leigh Matthews Trophy since Shane Crawford in 1999. On 11 January 2019, It was announced that Mitchell would miss the entire 2019 season after suffering a broken leg during a tackling drill at training.

Collingwood (2023–)
Mitchell was traded to Collingwood at the end of the 2022 AFL season.

Statistics
Updated to the end of the 2022 season.

|-
| 2012 ||  || 6
| 0 || — || — || — || — || — || — || — || — || — || — || — || — || — || — || 0
|-
| 2013 ||  || 6
| 14 || 11 || 17 || 134 || 136 || 270 || 45 || 66 || 0.2 || 0.3 || 9.1 || 8.4 || 17.5 || 2.8 || 4.2 || 2
|-
| 2014 ||  || 6
| 6 || 2 || 2 || 57 || 68 || 125 || 25 || 34 || 0.3 || 0.4 || 9.4 || 10.5 || 19.9 || 2.8 || 4.4 || 0
|-
| 2015 ||  || 6
| 19 || 10 || 7 || 211 || 303 || 514 || 70 || 123 || 0.5 || 0.4 || 11.1 || 15.9 || 27.1 || 3.7 || 6.5 || 12
|-
| 2016 ||  || 6
| 26 || 15 || 13 || 282 || 443 || 725 || 101 || 160 || 0.6 || 0.5 || 10.8 || 17.0 || 27.9 || 3.9 || 6.2 || 12
|-
| 2017 ||  || 3
| 22 || 10 || 10 || 307 || 480 || 787 || 117 || 143 || 0.5 || 0.5 || 14.0 || 21.8 || bgcolor=CAE1FF | 35.8† || 5.3 || 6.5 || 25
|-
| 2018 ||  || 3
| 24 || 13 || 7 || 389 || 459 || bgcolor=CAE1FF | 848† || 113 || 152 || 0.5 || 0.3 || 16.2 || bgcolor=CAE1FF | 19.1† || bgcolor=CAE1FF | 35.3† || 4.7 || 6.3 || bgcolor=98FB98 | 28±
|-
| 2019 ||  || 3
| 0 || — || — || — || — || — || — || — || — || — || — || — || — || — || — || 0
|-
| 2020 ||  || 3
| 17 || 2 || 1 || 172 || 257 || 429 || 52 || 75 || 0.1 || 0.1 || 10.1 || 15.1 || 25.2 || 3.1 || 4.4 || 10
|-
| 2021 ||  || 3
| 22 || 8 || 5 || 321 || 433 || 754 || 98 || 105 || 0.4 || 0.2 || 14.6 || bgcolor=CAE1FF | 19.7† || bgcolor=CAE1FF | 34.3† || 4.5 || 4.8 || 25
|-
| 2022 ||  || 3
| 21 || 5 || 7 || 239 || 350 || 589 || 81 || 96 || 0.2 || 0.3 || 11.4 || 16.7 || 28.0 || 3.9 || 4.6 || 9
|- class=sortbottom
! colspan=3 | Career
! 171 !! 76 !! 69 !! 2112 !! 2929 !! 5041 !! 702 !! 954 !! 0.4 !! 0.4 !! 12.4 !! 17.1 !! 29.5 !! 4.1 !! 5.6 || 123
|}

Notes

Honours and achievements
Team
 2× McClelland Trophy: 2014, 2016

Individual
 Brownlow Medal: 2018
 Leigh Matthews Trophy: 2018
 2× All-Australian team: 2017, 2018
 3× Peter Crimmins Medal: 2017, 2018, 2021
 Lou Richards Medal: 2018
 AFL Rising Star nominee: 2013

References

External links

 
 

Claremont Football Club players
Living people
1993 births
Sydney Swans players
Australian rules footballers from Western Australia
Hawthorn Football Club players
All-Australians (AFL)
Peter Crimmins Medal winners
Leigh Matthews Trophy winners
Brownlow Medal winners
People educated at Hale School
People educated at Carey Baptist Grammar School
Australian rules footballers from Melbourne